Masoud Farkhondeh Tinat Fard (born December 23, 1968 in Tehran) is an Iranian producer and director. He has been the winner of the Best Director's statue in Children Film Festival of Isfahan.

Films

Series

References

1968 births
Living people
Iranian producers
Iranian directors